Arboridia kermanshah, the grape leafhopper, is a species of leafhopper.

References

Erythroneurini
Insects described in 1963